Jacques Pitrat (born in Feb. 1934, died in Oct. 2019) was one of the French symbolic artificial intelligence pioneers. He developed knowledge based systems, expert systems, and theorem provers, and was a strong advocate of meta-knowledge based systems.

Graduated from École Polytechnique, and member of the Corps de l'armement, he began his career at the Laboratoire Central de l'Armement (French equivalent of DARPA) from 1959 to 1967. In 1966 he defended his Habilitation thesis (Doctorat d'État) about a theorem proving software using meta-theorems.

He worked at CNRS from 1967 till his retirement, ending his career as emeritus research director at end of 2015. He taught Artificial intelligence at Université Pierre et Marie Curie in Paris from 1967 till 1998.

Published books 
 Réalisation de programmes de démonstration de théorèmes utilisant des méthodes heuristiques. Thèse 1966.
 Un programme de démonstration de théorèmes. Monographies d'informatique de l'AFCET. Dunod. 1970.
 Textes, ordinateurs et compréhension. Eyrolles. 1985. Translated to English : An artificial approach to understanding natural language. North Oxford Academic (Grande-Bretagne) et GP Publishing (USA) 1988.
 Métaconnaissance, Futur de l'Intelligence Artificielle. Hermès. 1990.
 Penser autrement l'informatique. Hermès. 1993.
 De la machine à l'intelligence. Hermès. 1995.
 Artificial Beings - The conscience of a conscious machine ISTE, Wiley, Mars 2009.

Web resources 
 French wikipedia page about Jacques Pitrat
 LIP6 page
 Bootstrapping Artificial Intelligence blog
 Seminar (march 2020, in French) in honor of Jacques Pitrat
 French wikipage (more detailed) about Jacques Pitrat
 a software AI system inspired by Pitrat (RefPerSys)
 the self-generated source code of CAIA, the last software created by Jacques Pitrat

1934 births
2019 deaths
French computer scientists